Long Metapa (also known as Long Mentepah) is a settlement in Sarawak, Malaysia.

It is described in one source as a jungle shelter. The Samling Company had a logging camp in Long Metapa in 1994.

Neighbouring settlements include:
Long Pasia in sabah
long mio in sabah

References

Populated places in Sarawak